Joshua James Griffiths (born 5 September 2001) is an English professional footballer who plays as a goalkeeper for West Bromwich Albion.

Club career
Griffiths began his career at West Bromwich Albion, signing at the age of 10.

On 13 August 2020, he signed a season-long loan with League Two club Cheltenham Town. Griffiths kept a clean sheet on his professional debut in an EFL Cup 1–0 away win over Peterborough United in September 2020. Griffiths impressed on loan at Cheltenham, winning the club's Young Player of the Season award after keeping 23 clean sheets in 50 appearances as he played his part in a season which saw Cheltenham crowned League Two Champions.

Following his first loan spell, signed a new four-year contract with West Bromwich Albion, keeping him with the club until the summer of 2025. In July 2021 he moved on loan for the 2021–22 season to League One side Lincoln City. He made his Lincoln City debut away to Gillingham on the opening day of the 2021–22 season. On 5 March 2022, he suffered a season-ending ankle injury against Sheffield Wednesday.

On 14 July 2022, Griffiths signed for Portsmouth for the 2022–23 season on a season-long loan. He made his debut for Portsmouth away to Sheffield Wednesday on the opening day of the 2022–23 season, starting in a 3–3 draw. The loan was terminated by West Bromwich Albion on 11 January 2023, following 28 appearances for Portsmouth.

On 15 February 2023，Griffiths made his West Bromwich Albion debut in a 1-1 home draw against Blackburn Rovers.

International career
In March 2019 Griffiths represented the England U18 team against Mexico and later that year was an unused substitute for England U20 in their opening game of the Under 20 Elite League against the Netherlands.

On 15 March 2021, Griffiths received his first England U21 call up as part of the Young Lions squad for the 2021 UEFA European Under-21 Championship.

Career statistics

Honours
Cheltenham Town
EFL League Two: 2020–21

Individual
Cheltenham Town Young Player of the Season: 2020–21

References

2001 births
Living people
Sportspeople from Hereford
Footballers from Herefordshire
English footballers
Association football goalkeepers
England youth international footballers
West Bromwich Albion F.C. players
Cheltenham Town F.C. players
Lincoln City F.C. players
Portsmouth F.C. players
English Football League players
21st-century English people